Nogometni klub Steklar, commonly referred to as NK Steklar or simply Steklar, was a Slovenian football club from Rogaška Slatina, which played in the Slovenian PrvaLiga during the 1991–92 and 1992–93 seasons. Founded in 1946, they eventually went bankrupt in April 1999 and were dissolved.

A successor club was established in 1999 under the name NK Rogaška.

League history since 1991

References

Association football clubs established in 1946
Football clubs in Yugoslavia
1946 establishments in Slovenia
Defunct football clubs in Slovenia
Association football clubs disestablished in 1999